Jindabyne Central School (abbreviated as JCS) is a government-funded co-educational primary and comprehensive secondary day school, located at 4 Park Road in the town of  in the Snowy Mountains region of New South Wales, Australia.

Established as Jindabyne Primary School until 2006, the school enrolled approximately 880 students in 2018, from Year K to Year 12, of whom two percent identified as Indigenous Australians and nine percent were from a language background other than English. The school is operated by the NSW Department of Education; the primary principal is Steve McAlister and the relieving secondary principal is Michael Kowalewski The school's intake includes students from Jindabyne and the surrounding towns/villages of Berridale, Dalgety, Thredbo and Perisher Valley.

Overview 
The student leadership team consists of members of Year 12. Two members of each year group participate in the Student Representative Council (SRC).

Jindabyne Central School has a separate primary and secondary school uniform for both males and females.

Plans have been put forward regarding campus relocation and the dissolution of the Central School into separate Primary and Secondary Schools.

Notable alumni 
 Tim DraxlAustralian actor
 Manuela Berchtoldfreestyle skier; represented Australia at the Winter Olympics

See also 

 List of government schools in New South Wales
 Education in Australia

References

External links
 
 NSW Schools website

Educational institutions with year of establishment missing
Public high schools in New South Wales
Snowy Mountains
Public primary schools in New South Wales